Mike Knoll (born October 1, 1951) is a former American football coach.  He served as the head football coach at New Mexico State University from 1986 to 1989 and at Upper Iowa University from 2005 to 2008, compiling a career college football coaching record of 15–73.  Knoll also worked as an assistant coach at Missouri Western State University, the University of Tulsa, Iowa State University, the University of Miami, Northwestern University, Bacone College, and Northeastern State University.

Coaching career
Knoll was the head football coach at New Mexico State University from 1986 to 1989, where he compiled a record of 4–40 (.100). He ended his stint at New Mexico State on a 17-game losing streak.  New Mexico State won two games in 1987, and lost 10 or more games in 1986, 1988, and 1989. In each of his four seasons, the Aggies were outscored by 200 or more points.

Head coaching record

References

1951 births
Living people
Bacone Warriors football coaches
Iowa State Cyclones football coaches
Miami Hurricanes football coaches
Missouri Western Griffons football coaches
New Mexico State Aggies football coaches
Northeastern State RiverHawks football coaches
Northwestern Wildcats football coaches
Tulsa Golden Hurricane football coaches
Upper Iowa Peacocks football coaches
Missouri Western State University alumni